Yun In-sil  (born 10 January 1976,) is a North Korean women's international footballer who plays as a defender. She is a member of the North Korea women's national football team. She was part of the team at the 1999 FIFA Women's World Cup and 2003 FIFA Women's World Cup. She plays for the Amnokgang Sports Club.

References

1976 births
Living people
North Korean women's footballers
North Korea women's international footballers
Place of birth missing (living people)
1999 FIFA Women's World Cup players
2003 FIFA Women's World Cup players
Women's association football defenders
Footballers at the 1998 Asian Games
Footballers at the 2002 Asian Games
Asian Games gold medalists for North Korea
Asian Games silver medalists for North Korea
Asian Games medalists in football
Medalists at the 1998 Asian Games
Medalists at the 2002 Asian Games